Asuridia miltochristoides is a moth of the family Erebidae. It is found in the Khasia Hills.

The length of the forewings is 13–15 mm.  The forewings are pale carmine-rose, with a basal black spot on the subcostal vein. There is an antemedian zigzag line, an oblique median broad line, a stigma, and a twice sharply angled postmedian line with black lines running from it to the termen along the black edged with yellow. The hindwings are rose.

References

Nudariina
Moths described in 1913